The chupacabra is a blood-sucking cryptid.

Chupacabra may also refer to:

Media
 "Chupacabra" (The Walking Dead), an episode of the television series The Walking Dead
 Chupacabra: Dark Seas, a 2005 sci-fi / horror film
 Guns of El Chupacabra, a 1997 martial arts based monster film
 El Chupacabra, the winning team on the first season of The World Series of Pop Culture
 El Chupacabra, a character in the Disney film Planes
 "Chupacabra" (Grimm), a 2014 episode of American television series Grimm
 Chupacabra vs. The Alamo, a 2013 made-for-TV movie

Music
 Chupacabra (album), a 1997 album by Imani Coppola
 Chupacabras (album), a 2005 album by Phideaux Xavier
 El Chupacabra (EP), a 1998 album by Soil

Other uses
 Chupacabras (cycling race), an annual bicycle race in Ciudad Juárez, Mexico

See also
 Elmendorf Beast, the name given to a coyote blamed for several attacks on livestock in Elmendorf, Texas, which some local people linked it the legend of the chupacabra 
 Nightjar or goatsucker (the English translation of chupacabra), a medium-sized nocturnal or crepuscular bird